The Jawahar Planetarium is located in the city of Prayagraj in Uttar Pradesh, India. It was built in 1979 and is situated beside Anand Bhavan the former residence of the Nehru-Gandhi family and now a museum. It is managed by the 'Jawaharlal Nehru Memorial Fund' (established 1964), which has its headquarters at Teen Murti House, New Delhi.

Each year, the prestigious 'Jawaharlal Nehru Memorial Lecture' is also held at the planetarium, organised under the auspices of Jawaharlal Nehru Memorial Fund on the birth anniversary of India's first prime minister, 14 November.

See also
 Nehru Planetarium
 Swami Vivekananda Planetarium, Mangalore
 List of tourist attractions in Allahabad
 List of planetariums

References 

Planetaria in India
Buildings and structures in Allahabad
Tourist attractions in Allahabad
1979 establishments in Uttar Pradesh
Education in Allahabad
Science and technology in Allahabad
Monuments and memorials to Jawaharlal Nehru